Alexandra Höglund  (born 18 September 1990) is a Swedish football forward who has played for Djurgårdens IF. She has played Damallsvenskan football for Djurgårdens IF and Bälinge IF.

References

External links
 

Swedish women's footballers
Bälinge IF players
Djurgårdens IF Fotboll (women) players
Damallsvenskan players
Place of birth missing (living people)
1990 births
Living people
Women's association football forwards